The London Welsh Centre (founded as the Young Wales Association in 1920) is a community and arts centre on Gray's Inn Road, in the London Borough of Camden. The centre is owned and run by the London Welsh Trust.

The centre is a base for three choirs: the London Welsh Chorale, the Gwalia Male Voice Choir, and the London Welsh Male Voice Choir. The centre also hosts Welsh language classes, concerts, drama productions, the Young Welsh Singer of the Year Competition, the London Welsh School's , literary events, discussion programmes, and a variety of other events.

History 
The centre was built to provide a home for the Young Wales Association (YWA), which later became the London Welsh Association and is now the London Welsh Trust. The centre was built by Sir Howell J. Williams, who was a London-based building contractor and city council member. Williams gifted the building to the Young Welsh Association who, prior to the current buildings completion, were residing in a different plot of land also donated by Williams.

Young Wales Association 
The Young Wales Association was founded on 21 October 1920 at the Portman Rooms, Baker Street, when more than 400 members of the London Welsh community attended a meeting presided over by Margaret Lloyd George (who became the YWA's first President). The YWA was founded partly as a tribute to the dead of the First World War but mainly as a meeting place for young Welsh migrants. It was registered as a company limited by guarantee in March 1925 under the title of "Young Wales Association (London) Limited" and later changed its name to the London Welsh Association Limited. The London Welsh Trust was established in 1964.

During the first decade of its life, the YWA lacked a permanent home. Meetings were held first in a little café in Villiers Street, then in the premises of Gwilym Thomas at 26 Upper Montagu Street and later thanks to Owen Picton Davies, at the Hotel Somerset. At lunch hosted by Picton Davies at one of his hotels in July 1928, the Rt Hon Lord Atkin and the Rt Hon David Lloyd George spoke in support of a movement to provide headquarters for the Young Wales Association in London. As a result, Sir Howell J. Williams, a building contractor and London County Council member, purchased a site of just over  bounded by Doughty Street and Mecklenburgh Square on the West and Gray's Inn Road on the East, and offered it as a free gift to the Young Wales Association. These premises were formally opened by Margaret Lloyd George on 29 November 1930. Coincidentally, the site was almost exactly opposite that in Gray's Inn Road which had been occupied from 1772 to 1857 by the Welsh Charity School.

Current building 

Sir Howell J. Williams later rebuilt the properties that fronted onto Gray's Inn Road and completed the main hall of the current London Welsh Centre. The new premises were formally handed over by Williams on 5 November 1937. The properties on Doughty Street and Mecklenburgh Square have since been sold off for residential use, but the premises fronting on to Gray's Inn Road remain in use as the modern-day London Welsh Centre.

The bar at the centre was officially opened by Harry Secombe on Saint Patrick's Day (17 March) 1971.

The building is in the Holborn conservation area.

World War II 
During the period 1940–1946, the Welsh Services Club provided beds and meals for Welsh (and a few Canadian) military personnel passing through London. On 13 December 1941, the centre was officially committed for use as a Welsh Services Club. The Rt Hon Lord Atkin PC was chair of the newly formed Welsh Services Club, which was opened by David Lloyd George.

Activities 
The Centre seeks to promote the arts (primarily Welsh art and culture) and provide local community use facilities.

Magazine 
The London Welsh Association's monthly magazine, Y Ddolen, was introduced in 1925. When it reappeared after the Second World War in October 1946, it was called Y Ddinas. Some idea of the range of activities at the London Welsh Centre in the post-war years can be gathered from the announcement in Y Ddinas for just one month, January 1948. The centre was the venue for three dances, two nights of community singing, a concert, two whist drives and an "at home". The centre's magazine is now published quarterly alongside regular newsletters by email.

Welsh Language Classes 
Welsh language classes have been held more or less continuously at the London Welsh Centre since 1946. The Saturday morning Welsh classes for children, which began in 1957, resulted in the establishment of the London Welsh School a year later. Welsh language classes are now held at the Centre each week, for three different levels of ability. All-day, intensive Welsh language courses are held on weekends, two or three times each year.

Presidents of the London Welsh Trust 
1921–1922 Dame Margaret Lloyd George, JP
1923–1924 Sir Howell J Williams, DL, J.P LCC
1925–1926 T. Woodward Owen
1927 David Davies MP
1928–1930 Owen Picton Davies
1931–1932 J.T. Lewis, MA, OBE
1933 T.W Glyn Evans
1934–1935 The Rt Hon David Lloyd George, OM, MP
1936–1937 Rhys Hopkin Morris
1938–1944 The Rt Hon Lord Atkin, PC
1946–1947 The Rt Hon Clement Davies, KC, MP
1947–1949 Sir Wynn P. Wheldon, DSO
1949–1951 The Rev H. Elvet Lewis, CH
1951–1953 The Rt Hon Lord Justice Morris, PC, CBE, MC, LLD
1953–1955 Sir Ben Bowen Thomas, MA
1955–1959 The Rt Hon Lord Ogmore, PC, TD
1959–1962 The Rt Hon Lord Aberdare
1962–1964 Air Chief Marshal Sir Hugh Pughe Lloyd GBE, KCB, MC, DFC, LLD
1964–1969 William Harries
1969–1970 The Rt Hon Lord Aberdare
1970–1982 Michael Williams
1982–1988 The Rt Lord Edmund Davies
1988–1994 The Rt Hon Sir William Mars-Jones MBE, MA, LLD
1994–2001 Sir Maldwyn Thomas
2001–2008 The Rt Hon Lord Morris of Aberavon KG, QC, LLD
2008–present Huw Edwards

References

External links 
 

Welsh emigration
Endangered diaspora languages

Welsh culture
Welsh diaspora in Europe